Thurza  is an English female given name which had some currency in the 1800s  and is now extremely rare.  It is alternatively spelled  Thirza. Origins-Old testament Book of Numbers 28, Tirzah, meaning delightful and pleasantness. Scottish Gaelic Thursa 'The shining one'. Thurza was fashionable until the middle 1950s.

People with this name include:

Cornilia Thurza Crosby, a Maine hunting guide.
Thirza Petty, the name of both the wife and daughter of John Petty

English feminine given names